Dina is the surname of:

 Márton Dina (born 1996), Hungarian professional cyclist
 Mihai Dina (born 1985), Romanian footballer
 Pavol Diňa (born 1963), Slovak football coach and former player
 Tith Dina (born 1993), Cambodian footballer
 Yossi Dina (born 1954), Israeli pawnbroker, businessman, entrepreneur and reality television personality